Peter Rosenmeier (born 23 March 1984) is a Danish male table tennis player, previous World Champion and current Paralympic Champion of his class (M6).

Rosenmeier has participated at all Summer Paralympics since the 2004 Summer Paralympics in Athens, where he won a bronze medal. At the 2008 Summer Paralympics in Beijing he won a gold medal, at the 2012 Summer Paralympics in London a bronze medal, and at the 2016 Summer Paralympics in Rio de Janeiro a gold medal.

References

External links 
 Profile at paralympic.dk 

1984 births
Living people
People from Hadsund
Paralympic table tennis players of Denmark
Medalists at the 2004 Summer Paralympics
Medalists at the 2008 Summer Paralympics
Medalists at the 2012 Summer Paralympics
Medalists at the 2016 Summer Paralympics
Medalists at the 2020 Summer Paralympics
Paralympic gold medalists for Denmark
Paralympic silver medalists for Denmark
Paralympic bronze medalists for Denmark
Paralympic medalists in table tennis
Danish male table tennis players
Table tennis players at the 2004 Summer Paralympics
Table tennis players at the 2008 Summer Paralympics
Table tennis players at the 2012 Summer Paralympics
Table tennis players at the 2016 Summer Paralympics
Table tennis players at the 2020 Summer Paralympics
Sportspeople from the North Jutland Region
21st-century Danish people